Chryseobacterium cucumeris  is a  Gram-negative bacteria from the genus of Chryseobacterium which has been isolated from a Cucumber from Gunsan in Korea.

References

External links
Type strain of Chryseobacterium cucumeris at BacDive -  the Bacterial Diversity Metadatabase

cucumeris
Bacteria described in 2017